The Adventures of the Bailey School Kids (or, simply, The Bailey School Kids) is a supernatural children's book series. The books in the series are co-authored by Marcia T. Jones and Debbie Dadey. John Steven Gurney is the original illustrator of the series (covers and interior illustrations) and originated the appearance of the characters. During the early 2000s some of the books were reissued with cover illustrations by Nathan Hale.

In each story, the Bailey School kids encounter a relatively innocuous character (such as a school teacher, custodian, etc.) who may or may not be a mythical being (e.g. a vampire, werewolf, dragon, etc.). The reader is left guessing whether the innocuous character is said mythical being or not.

There are more than 80 books in the series, including Super Specials, Holiday Special Editions, the BSK "Jr" chapter books series, and the spin-off Bailey City Monsters series for grades 2-4. The first novel, Vampires Don't Wear Polka Dots, was published in 1990.

Main characters

 Howard "Howie": Howie is logical and intelligent. His dad works for FATS (Federal Aeronautics Technology Station).
 Melody: Melody is the bravest of the group in most situations. She is also very competitive with Eddie, and tends to act protective of Liza.
 Elizabeth "Liza": Liza is very scared and sensitive. Usually, she does not want to resort to methods that will result in others being hurt, even if they are a monster. She always believes in fairy tales, and she cannot swim.
 Edward "Eddie": Eddie is the tough person of the group. He always makes fun of his friends when they say they have seen monsters and continuously attempts to prove them wrong, which leads him into many unfortunate or embarrassing situations.

Recurring characters
 Mrs. Jeepers: Mrs. Jeepers is the group's teacher, and some of them think she is a vampiress. Other teachers before her quit because of their class but Mrs. Jeepers is the only one who can keep them under control due to their fear of her. Her family is from Transylvania, and she has a coffin-like box in her basement. Despite her bizarre family and unusual behavior, it is never known if she really is a vampiress; in general, she does her job as a teacher well. She appears in all the Super Special editions.
 Mr. Jenkins: Mr. Jenkins is the camp counselor of Camp Lone Wolf, and some think he is a werewolf. Like Mrs. Jeepers, it is never known if he really is a werewolf. He comes off as a mean and tough man, but is sometimes shown to have a soft side, especially towards nature. He has two known cousins, one that dances hula, and one who ran for president. He is a tall and hairy man who wears torn clothes and a dog collar, has pointy ears, and often demonstrates his characteristic howl.
 Dr. Victor: A brilliant scientist residing in Bailey City. Some people think he is, or may be related to the original Dr. Victor Frankenstein, leading them to believe his companion, Frank, is really Frankenstein's monster. After his first appearance, he argues with Frank, prompting the two of them to separate, but they make up later on. It is believed that he was directly responsible for the creation of "Frankenstein's Bride".
 Carey: Carey is the popular, rich girl at Bailey Elementary. Although she comes off as a spoiled brat, she tends to care about what is going on around her, especially when it comes to Mrs. Jeepers being a "vampiress". Eddie likes to scare Carey by pulling pranks on her.

List of books

The Adventures Of The Bailey School Kids

 Vampires Don't Wear Polka Dots
 Werewolves Don't Go To Summer Camp
 Santa Claus Doesn't Mop Floors
 Leprechauns Don't Play Basketball
 Ghosts Don't Eat Potato Chips
 Frankenstein Doesn't Plant Petunias
 Aliens Don't Wear Braces
 Genies Don't Ride Bicycles
 Pirates Don't Wear Pink Sunglasses
 Witches Don't Do Backflips
 Skeletons Don't Play Tubas
 Cupid Doesn't Flip Hamburgers
 Gremlins Don't Chew Bubble Gum
 Monsters Don't Scuba Dive
 Zombies Don't Play Soccer
 Dracula Doesn't Drink Lemonade
 Elves Don't Wear Hard Hats
 Martians Don't Take Temperatures
 Gargoyles Don't Drive School Buses
 Wizards Don't Need Computers
 Mummies Don't Coach Softball
 Cyclops Doesn't Roller-Skate
 Angels Don't Know Karate
 Dragons Don't Cook Pizza
 Bigfoot Doesn't Square Dance
 Mermaids Don't Run Track
 Bogeyman Don't Play Football
 Unicorns Don't Give Sleigh Rides
 Knights Don't Teach Piano
 Hercules Doesn't Pull Teeth
 Ghouls Don't Scoop Ice Cream
 Phantoms Don't Drive Sports Cars
 Giants Don't Go Snowboarding
 Frankenstein Doesn't Slam Hockey Pucks
 Trolls Don't Ride Roller Coasters
 Wolfmen Don’t Hula Dance
 Goblins Don't Play Video Games
 Ninjas Don't Bake Pumpkin Pie
 Dracula Doesn't Rock And Roll
 Sea Monsters Don't Ride Motorcycles
 The Bride Of Frankenstein Doesn't Bake Cookies
 Robots Don't Catch Chicken Pox
 Vikings Don't Wear Wrestling Belts
 Ghosts Don't Ride Wild Horses
 Wizards Don't Wear Graduation Gowns
 Sea Serpents Don't Juggle Water Balloons
 Frankenstein Doesn't Start Food Fights
 Dracula Doesn't Play Kickball
 Werewolves Don’t Run For President
 The Abominable Snowman Doesn't Roast Marshmallows
 Dragons Don't Throw Snowballs

Bailey School Kids Super Special Editions

 Mrs. Jeepers Is Missing
 Mrs. Jeepers' Batty Vacation
 Mrs. Jeepers' Secret Cave
 Mrs. Jeepers In Outer Space
 Mrs. Jeepers' Monster Class Trip
 Mrs. Jeepers On Vampire Island
 Mrs. Jeepers' Scariest Halloween... EVER!!!!
 Mrs. Jeepers' Creepy Christmas
 The Bailey School Kids - Joke Book

Bailey School Kids Holiday Specials

 Swamp Monsters Don't Chase Wild Turkeys
 Aliens Don't Carve Jack-O-Lanterns
 Mrs. Claus Doesn't Climb Telephone Poles
 Leprechauns Don't Play Fetch
 Ogres Don't Hunt Easter Eggs

Bailey School Kids "Jr" Chapter Books

 Ghosts DO Splash In Puddles
 Reindeer DO Wear Striped Underwear
 Cupid DOES Eat Chocolate-Covered Snails
 Pirates DO Ride Scooters
 Dragons DO Eat Homework
 Wizards DO Roast Turkeys
 Vampires DO Hunt Marshmallows
 Cavemen DO Drive School Buses
 Snow Monsters DO Drink Hot Chocolate

Bailey City Monsters

 The Monsters Next Door
 Howling At The Hauntlys’
 Vampire Trouble
 Kilmer's Pet Monster
 Double Trouble Monsters
 Spooky Spells
 Vampire Baby
 Snow Monster Mystery
 Happy Boo Day

Little Kids

 SS The Hauntlys' Hairy Surprise

Also by Marcia Thornton Jones and Debbie Dadey

Ghostville Elementary

 Ghost Class
 Ghost Game
 New Ghoul In School
 Happy Haunting
 Stage Fright
 Happy Boo-Day to You!
 Hide-and-Spook
 Ghosts Be Gone!
 Beware of the Blabbermouth!
 Class Trip to the Haunted House
 The Treasure Haunt
 Frights! Camera! Action!
 Guys and Ghouls
 Frighting Like Cats and Dogs
 A Very Haunted Holiday
 Red, White and Boo!
 No Haunting Zone!

References

External links
 Marcia T. Jones
 Debbie Dadey
 John Steven Gurney

Series of children's books
American children's novels
Novels set in schools
Scholastic franchises